Bolton Lake is a lake in the Pacific Ocean drainage basin on the west coast of Vancouver Island in Strathcona Regional District, British Columbia, Canada. The primary outflow is an unnamed creek to Nesook Bay on the Tlupana Inlet of the Pacific Ocean.

References

Lakes of British Columbia
Nootka Land District